The Arboretum de Segrez is a historic arboretum located within the Domaine de Segrez on Rue Alphonse Lavallée, Saint-Sulpice-de-Favières, Essonne, Île-de-France, France.

The arboretum was established in 1857 as a scientific undertaking by Pierre Alphonse Martin Lavallée (1836-1884), a French botanist and horticulturist. It included a herbarium and botanical library, and by 1875 was one of the largest collections of woody plants in the world. After Lavallée's death in 1884, scientific cultivation of the arboretum ceased, but a number of mature specimens can still be seen on the domain's grounds.

See also 
 List of botanical gardens in France

References 
 Domaine de Segrez
 Saint-Sulpice-de-Favières: Segrez
 Arboretum Segrezianum. Icones selectae Arborum et Fruticum in Hortis Segrezianis collectorum. Description et figures des espèces nouvelles, rares ou critiques de l'Arboretum de Segrez. Paris : J.B. Baillière et fils, 1880–1885.
 Liberty Hyde Bailey, The Standard Cyclopedia of Horticulture, The Macmillan Company, 1914, page 347.
 Conservatoire Jardins Paysages entry (French)
 Gralon.net entry (French)

Segrez, Arboretum de
Segrez, Arboretum de